Lutherville is a census-designated place (CDP) in Baltimore County, Maryland, United States. As of the 2010 census it had a population of 6,504. Prior to 2010 the area was part of the Lutherville-Timonium CDP. Within its borders lies the Lutherville Historic District.

Geography
Lutherville is located at  (39.4240, −76.6177).

The town is located north of Baltimore City along York Road (Maryland Route 45). It is bordered on the north by Timonium, on the west by Interstate 83, on the south by Towson, and on the east by the Hampton neighborhood. The boundary between Lutherville and Timonium is Ridgely Road.

Lutherville is located in the Piedmont region of the United States, and lies in the humid subtropical climate zone, with hot and humid summers leading into winters that are chilly but not extreme by American standards.

Demographics

As of the 2010 census, there were 6,504 people and 2,672 households in the CDP. The racial makeup of the CDP is 85.0% White, 3.4% African American, 0.2% Native American, 8.2% Asian, 0.2% Native Hawaiian and Pacific Islander, and 3.3% Hispanic or Latino.

Out of the 2,672 households recorded in the 2010 census, 28.3% had children under the age of 18 living with them.

Transportation

Roads
Major roads in Lutherville include:
Dulaney Valley Road (MD-146), forming part of Lutherville's eastern boundary with Hampton
Ridgely Road, forming Lutherville's northern boundary with Timonium
Seminary Avenue (MD-131)
York Road (MD-45)

Public transportation

The Maryland Transit Administration's light rail line serves the community with the Lutherville Light Rail Stop. In addition, bus routes 8 and 9 provide regular service along the York Road corridor, meeting at the Lutherville Light Rail Stop. There is also a limited amount of bus service on Bus Route 12 along Dulaney Valley Road to Stella Maris Hospice. In addition, the Baltimore CityLink Red line serves the Lutherville Light Rail station.

The MTA light rail line uses the right-of-way of the old Northern Central Railway (later, part of the extensive Pennsylvania Railroad system). During the Civil War, President Abraham Lincoln travelled through Lutherville on this railroad en route to Gettysburg, Pennsylvania, to deliver the Gettysburg Address on November 19, 1863. Less than two years later, on April 21, 1865, Lincoln's funeral train also passed through Lutherville on its way from Washington, D.C. to his final resting place at Springfield, Illinois. The Pennsylvania Railroad (PRR) operated long-distance passenger trains from Baltimore over the line to Chicago, St. Louis, and Buffalo as late as the 1960s. The former PRR Lutherville freight and passenger station on Railroad Avenue is now a private residence.

History

The oldest section of Lutherville dates back to 1852,  when it was founded by two Lutheran ministers as a planned community, anchored by a Lutheran seminary and church. The land was originally part of the vast Hampton Estate of Charles Ridgely, from whom it was purchased in 1851.

The two ministers, Benjamin Kurtz and John Morris, named the community after the 16th-century German reformer Martin Luther. The Lutherville Female Seminary, as it was initially called when chartered in 1853, was built near the tracks of the Baltimore & Susquehanna Railroad, a forerunner of the Northern Central Railway. In 1895, the institution was renamed the Maryland College for Women.  Following a devastating fire in 1911, the college was rebuilt and continued in operation until 1952. Its campus is now an adult congregate living facility, College Manor.

The Lutherville Historic District was added to the National Register of Historic Places in 1972. Notable structures, in addition to the old college building and the many Victorian homes, include:

 St. Paul's Lutheran Church, started in 1856 by John Morris. The present stone sanctuary was built in 1898.
 St. John's Methodist Church, built in 1869.
 Church of the Holy Comforter, an Episcopal church built in 1888.
 Oak Grove, the house of Lutherville founder John Morris, built in 1852 on Morris Avenue. Filmmaker John Waters lived in the Oak Grove house with his family as a teenager in the 1960s. Some of Waters' earliest filmmaking efforts took place at the house.
 Octagon house on Kurtz Avenue, built of concrete in 1855 by another Lutheran minister who also served as the town's postmaster.

Notable people

 All Time Low, pop punk band
 Raymond Berry, Baltimore Colts Hall of Famer
 Ryan Boyle, professional lacrosse player
 Bosley Crowther, film critic
 Cinder Road, rock band
 Divine, actor
 Samuel T. Durrance, astronaut/physicist
 Conor Gill, professional lacrosse player
 Mark Hamilton, Major League Baseball player
 Billy Hunter, former Major League Baseball shortstop and manager
 Phil Karn, internet engineer
 Santa J. Ono, medical scientist, 28th President, University of Cincinnati; 15th President, University of British Columbia
 Rafael Palmeiro, former Major League Baseball first baseman
 Jim Palmer, former Baltimore Orioles pitcher and Hall of Famer
 Kevin Plank, entrepreneur (UnderArmour), resident
 Brooks Robinson, former Baltimore Orioles third baseman and Hall of Famer
 Mike Singletary, Hall of Fame football player, current NFL coach
 J. Frederick C. Talbott, U.S. congressman 1878–1918
 Bob Turley, former Major League Baseball pitcher
 Jerry Turner, television news anchorman (1929–1987)
 Johnny Unitas, former Baltimore Colt and Hall of Famer
 John Waters, filmmaker
 Derek Waters, actor & comedian

Education
Public schools
 Dulaney High School (in Timonium)
 Hampton Elementary School
 Lutherville Laboratory Elementary School
 Ridgely Middle School
 Pinewood Elementary School
A portion of Lutherville's high school-age students attend nearby Towson High School.

Gallery

References

 
Census-designated places in Baltimore County, Maryland
Census-designated places in Maryland
Populated places established in 1852
1852 establishments in Maryland